KCJZ (105.3 FM, "Bob FM") is a commercial radio station that is licensed to Cambria, California and serves the San Luis Obispo County area. The station is owned by Adelman Broadcasting and airs a variety hits format.

History
KCJZ began broadcasting in 2013. In June 2014, Adelman Broadcasting adopted a variety hits format for the station with the branding "Bob FM".

References

External links

2013 establishments in California
Bob FM stations
Mass media in San Luis Obispo County, California
CJZ
Radio stations established in 2013